Himantoides is a monotypic moth genus in the family Sphingidae erected by Arthur Gardiner Butler in 1876. Its only species, Himantoides undata, which was described by Francis Walker in 1856, is known from Jamaica.

References

Dilophonotini
Monotypic moth genera
Taxa named by Arthur Gardiner Butler
Moths of the Caribbean